NSCA may refer to:
 National Safety Council of Australia
 Nova Scotia Court of Appeal
 Nuclear Safety and Control Act
 National Strength and Conditioning Association
 Negros State College of Agriculture, now known as Central Philippines State University